Martín Wagner (born 15 June 1985 in Coronel Suárez) is an Argentine football midfielder who plays for Estudiantes San Luis.

Career
Wagner began his professional playing career with Olimpo de Bahía Blanca in 2004 in the Primera División. He made his league debut in a 0-2 away win against Atlético Rafaela on 28 February 2004 aged 18. Wagner was part of the team that was relegated from the Primera División in 2006, but bounced straight back the following season by winning the Primera B Nacional Apertura and Clausura championships.

In 2008 Olimpo were relegated again, this time Wagner remained a Primera División player by joining Racing Club de Avellaneda. On 18 January 2013 Wagner signed for Tampines Rovers who play in the S.League. Manager Player Mister Marcos Garzia  (Garziafutbol) Argentine.

Titles

External links
 
 BDFA profile 
 Argentine Primera statistics at Futbol XXI 

1985 births
Living people
Sportspeople from Buenos Aires Province
People from Coronel Suárez Partido
Argentine footballers
Association football midfielders
Olimpo footballers
Racing Club de Avellaneda footballers
San Martín de San Juan footballers
Argentinos Juniors footballers
Argentine Primera División players
Defensa y Justicia footballers
Argentine expatriate footballers
Expatriate footballers in Singapore
Singapore Premier League players
Argentine people of Volga German descent
Tampines Rovers FC players